Edgar Salo Keats (January 30, 1915 – March 2, 2019) was a rear admiral in the United States Navy. At the time of his death, he was the oldest living graduate of United States Naval Academy. Keats graduated from the USNA in 1935.

Keats was a naval aviator. He was promoted to rear admiral shortly before his retirement in 1958. Following military service, he held civilian positions of leadership in the defense and construction sectors. Late in his life, he won gold medals in the Maryland Senior Olympics. He turned 100 in January 2015. He died on March 2, 2019, at the age of 104 from complications of a fall.

References

1915 births
2019 deaths
Military personnel from Chicago
American centenarians
Men centenarians
United States Navy admirals
Deaths from falls
Place of death missing
United States Navy personnel of World War II